Merzenich is a municipality in the district of Düren in the state of North Rhine-Westphalia, Germany. It is located approximately 4 km north-east of Düren.

Mayor
Georg Gelhausen (CDU) was elected in September 2015, and re-elected in September 2020.

References

Düren (district)